Somapur (Allapur) is a village in Dharwad district of Karnataka, India.

Demographics 
As of the 2011 Census of India there were 318 households in Somapur and a total population of 1,616 consisting of 844 males and 772 females. There were 186 children ages 0-6.

References

Villages in Dharwad district